KLAR (1300 AM, "Radio Poder") is a radio station that serves the Laredo, Texas, United States and Nuevo Laredo, Tamaulipas, Mexico border area. It broadcasts a Spanish-language religious format.

History
1300 AM received its FCC license on September 7, 1961 as KGNS. KGNS was owned by the Southwestern Operating Company and broadcast during the day only with 500 watts; it took its call sign from KGNS-TV channel 8, which had adopted it several years earlier. In 1964, KGNS powered up to 1,000 watts, and in 1967, it began nighttime broadcasts. The station was sold twice in the early 1970s, not long after changing its call letters to KLAR. For most of the 1970s, KLAR was an English language Top 40 station.

In June 1995, Crystal Media Inc. sold KLAR to Faith and Power Communications Inc., a Laredo-based non-profit organization headed by pastor Héctor Manuel Patiño.

External links

LAR
LAR
Talk radio stations in the United States
LAR
Radio stations established in 1972